Ancistris is a monotypic moth genus of the family Noctuidae. Its only species, Ancistris saturnina, is known from Madagascar. Both the genus and the species were first described by Paul Mabille in 1897.

References

Catocalinae
Noctuoidea genera
Monotypic moth genera